The 2019 Oceania Rugby Cup for national rugby union teams in the Oceania region was held in Papua New Guinea in August 2019.  won the title by finishing on top of the table after completing the round-robin tournament undefeated.

Standings

Matches

See also
 Oceania Rugby Cup

References

2019
Rugby union competitions in Oceania for national teams
2019 rugby union tournaments for national teams
2019 in Oceanian rugby union
2019 in Papua New Guinean sport
2019 in Solomon Islands sport
2019 in Nauruan sport
International rugby union competitions hosted by Papua New Guinea
Oceania Rugby Cup